Capurganá Airport  is an airport serving the Caribbean coastal town of Capurganá in the Chocó Department of Colombia. No roads go to Capurganá, so boats and aircraft are the primary means in and out.

North arrivals and departures are over the water.

See also

Transport in Colombia
List of airports in Colombia

References

External links
OpenStreetMap - Capurganá
OurAirports - Capurganá
FallingRain - Capurganá Airport

Airports in Colombia
Colombia–Panama border crossings